Border states may refer to:
Limitrophe states, states bordering a given country, e.g. Russia
Border states (American Civil War), the five slave states that remained in the Union during the American Civil War (Delaware, Maryland, Kentucky, Missouri, and from 1863, West Virginia)
Border states (Eastern Europe), the newly independent countries (or "states") bordering the Soviet Union during the interwar period
International border states of the United States, U.S. states that border another country

Borders